Olena Mykolaivna Shaparna (born 4 February 1979) is a Ukrainian former artistic gymnast. She competed at the 1996 Summer Olympics.

See also
List of Olympic female gymnasts for Ukraine

References

1979 births
Living people
Ukrainian female artistic gymnasts
Gymnasts at the 1996 Summer Olympics
Olympic gymnasts of Ukraine
Sportspeople from Kherson
20th-century Ukrainian women